This is a list of Portuguese football transfers for the summer of 2009. The summer transfer window opened on 1 July and closed at midnight on 31 August. Players may have been bought before the transfer windows opens, but may only joined their new club on 1 July. Only moves involving Primeira Liga clubs are listed. Additionally, players without a club may join a club at any time.

Transfers

 A player who signed with a club before the opening of the summer transfer window, will officially join his new club on 1 July. While a player who joined a club after 1 July will join his new club following his signature of the contract.

References

2009–10 in Portuguese football
Football transfers summer 2009
Lists of Portuguese football transfers